Ernest ("Ernie") Cholakis (born September 17, 1962 in Winnipeg, Manitoba) is a former field hockey player from Canada, who participated in the 1984 Summer Olympics in Los Angeles, California. There he finished in tenth place with the Men's National Team.

International senior competitions

 1984 – Olympic Games, Los Angeles (10th)

References
 Canadian Olympic Committee

External links
 

1962 births
Living people
Canadian male field hockey players
Canadian people of Greek descent
Field hockey players at the 1984 Summer Olympics
Olympic field hockey players of Canada
Field hockey players from Winnipeg
Pan American Games medalists in field hockey
Pan American Games gold medalists for Canada
Field hockey players at the 1983 Pan American Games
Medalists at the 1983 Pan American Games